Odoyevsky District  is an administrative district (raion), one of the twenty-three in Tula Oblast, Russia. Within the framework of municipal divisions, it is incorporated as Odoyevsky Municipal District. It is located in the west of the oblast. Its administrative center is the urban locality (a work settlement) of Odoyev. The population at the 2010 census was 13,184  The population of Odoyev accounts for 46.6% of the district's total population.

Culture
A well-known craft in the district is the ceramic pottery Filimonovo toys produced in the village of Filimonovo.

References

Notes

Sources

Districts of Tula Oblast
